The 2023 Primera División season (officially the Copa de Primera TIGO-Visión Banco 2023 for sponsorship reasons) is the 89th season of the Paraguayan Primera División, the top-flight professional football league in Paraguay. The season consists of two tournaments, Apertura and Clausura, and it began on 27 January and will end on 11 December 2023. The fixtures for the season were announced on 14 November 2022.

Olimpia are the defending champions, having won the 2022 Clausura tournament.

Teams
Twelve teams compete in this season: the top ten teams in the relegation table of the 2022 season, and the top two teams in the 2022 Paraguayan División Intermedia (Sportivo Trinidense and Sportivo Luqueño). The promoted teams replaced Sol de América and 12 de Octubre, who were relegated to the second tier at the end of the previous season.

Stadia and locations

Notes

Personnel and kits

Managerial changes

Notes

Torneo Apertura
The Torneo Apertura, named "Homenaje al Dr. Marcelo Pecci", is the 127th official championship of the Primera División and the first championship of the 2022 season. It started on 27 January and will end on 11 June.

Standings

Results

Top scorers

{| class="wikitable" border="1"
|-
! Rank
! Name
! Club
! Goals
|-
| align=center | 1
| Marcelo Pérez
|Sportivo Luqueño
| align=center | 6
|-
| rowspan=5 align=center | 2
| Facundo Barceló
|Guaraní
| rowspan=5 align=center | 4
|-
| Néstor Camacho
|Guaraní
|-
| Derlis González
|Olimpia
|-
| Lorenzo Melgarejo
|Libertad
|-
| Héctor Villalba
|Libertad
|-
| align=center | 7
| Elías Sarquis
|Sportivo Ameliano
| align=center | 3
|}

Source: Soccerway

Torneo Clausura
The Torneo Clausura, named "Centenario del Club Tacuary", will be the 128th official championship of the Primera División and the second and last championship of the 2022 season. It will begin on 7 July and will end on 11 December.

Standings

Results

Relegation
Relegation is determined at the end of the season by computing an average of the number of points earned per game over the past three seasons. The two teams with the lowest average will be relegated to the División Intermedia for the following season.

 Updated to matches played on 19 March 2023. Source: APF

See also
2023 Copa Paraguay
2023 Paraguayan División Intermedia

References

External links
APF's official website 

Paraguay
Paraguayan Primera División seasons
2023 in Paraguayan football
Paraguay